Elections to City of Bradford Metropolitan District Council were held on were held on Thursday, 1 May 1980, with boundary changes prompting the entirety of the council to be elected.

The boundary changes subtracted a ward from the existing 31 - decreasing the councillor total by three to 90 - with just under half the ward names surviving the changes:

Abolished:
Allerton
Bingley: Central, East, North & West
Clayton, Ambler Thorn & Queensbury
Craven: Silsden, Addingham, Kildwick & Steeton with Eastburn
Denholme, Cullingworth, Bingley South & Wilsden
Haworth, Oakworth & Oxenhope
Ilkley: Ben Rhydding, Ilkley North, South & West
Ilkley: Burley, Holme & Menston
Keighley: Keighley Central, East & South
Keighley: Morton & Keighley North East
Keighley: North West & West
Laisterdyke
Manningham
Shipley: Central, North & East
Shipley: South & West

Created: 
Bingley
Bingley Rural
Clayton
Craven
Ilkley
Keighley North
Keighley South
Keighley West
Queensbury
Rombalds
Shipley East
Shipley West
Toller
Worth Valley

 

The election resulted in the Labour gaining control of the council directly from the Conservatives.

Election result

This result had the following consequences for the total number of seats on the council after the elections:

Ward results

References

1980 English local elections
1980
1980s in West Yorkshire